Paul Cattier (born 1 May 1986) is a French professional footballer who plays as a goalkeeper for Championnat National 2 club Poitiers.

Career
Born in Avignon, Cattier began his career in 2001 in the Grenoble youth team, then joined Rodez in 2003. After one season he moved back to Grenoble and was promoted to the first team. He played his first two games in the 2007–08 season.

Cattier joined Athlético Marseille in June 2019. He signed for Poitiers in 2021.

References

External links
 
 
 LFP Profile

1986 births
Living people
Sportspeople from Avignon
French footballers
Association football goalkeepers
Grenoble Foot 38 players
ÉFC Fréjus Saint-Raphaël players
SO Romorantin players
Jura Sud Foot players
Athlético Marseille players
Stade Poitevin FC players
Ligue 1 players
Championnat National players
Championnat National 2 players
Championnat National 3 players